Deh-e Now (also Romanized as Dehnow; also known as Khodāābād, Khodadad, and Khudāābād) is a village in Siriz Rural District, Yazdanabad District, Zarand County, Kerman Province, Iran. At the 2006 census, its population was 809, in 189 families.

References 

Populated places in Zarand County